Alfred Patchett Warbrick (24 February 1860 – 19 May 1940) was a New Zealand boatbuilder, rugby player and tourist guide. Of Māori descent, he identified with the Ngāti Rangitihi and Te Arawa iwi.

Warbrick was the first of five children of Abraham Warbrick, an English immigrant, and Nga Karauna Paerau, a Māori and the daughter of a Ngāti Rangitihi chief. After his mother died, his father remarried and had seven more children. Four of his brothersArthur, Fred, Joe and Billywent on to tour Britain, Ireland and Australia with Alfred as part of the 1888–89 New Zealand Native football team.

For his education, Warbrick was sent to the Catholic school at Takapuna, near Auckland. There, with the help of the minister for native affairs Donald McLean, Warbrick became an apprentice to the boatbuilder Charles Bailey. He was working with Bailey from age 14 to 24, and practiced rowing, yachting, hunting and rugby in his free time. In 1888 he and his four brothers were included into the New Zealand Native Football Team, which was captained by Joe Warbrick. Earlier in 1885 Alfred moved to Te Wairoa, to work as a boatbuilder in the Lake Rotorua district and to help Joe in his land business. Besides that, Alfred also built a public hall at Wairoa.

After the volcanic eruption at Mount Tarawera and Lake Rotomahana of 10 June 1886, Alfred and his brothers Arthur and Joe joined the rescue operations. Alfred established himself as a local guide, and worked in this capacity for the next few years. He never accepted that the Pink and White Terraces at Lake Rotomahana were destroyed, and become involved in the public debates concerning their fate. In 1903 he was appointed as head guide of the trip to Waimangu Geyserthen the largest geyser in the world organised by Department of Tourist and Health Resorts. On 30 August 1903, the geyser suddenly erupted killing Joe and three other tourists in vicinity.

Warbrick continued working as a guide until retirement, becoming the subject of the James Cowan's 1934 book Adventures in Geyserland. He died on 19 May 1940 and was buried at Whakarewarewa. On 30 December 1880 he married Florence Sarah Mays, the daughter of a storekeeper, at Devonport, Auckland. They had three sons born between 1882 and 1885. Warbrick had a fourth son with Ngapuia Tupara, born in 1893 or 1894, and at least four more children with Georgina Te Rauoriwa Strew, a concert party performer and guide at Whakarewarewa. Georgina Warbrick died in 1953, and Warbrick's other wife, Iripu Edie Warbrick of Whakarewarewa, died in 1958.

References

1860 births
1940 deaths
Ngāti Rangitihi people
Te Arawa people
New Zealand Māori rugby union players
Unsuccessful candidates in the 1887 New Zealand general election
1886 eruption of Mount Tarawera
Māori All Blacks players
People from the Bay of Plenty Region